is a Japanese aesthetical concept thought to have originated amongst the merchant classes of Edo (modern-day Tokyo) in Edo period Japan.

 came to prominence within the context of the official social hierarchy of Edo-period Japan, subverting class through an expression of material wealth that formed an aesthetic language specifically aimed at one's peers – typically those within the merchant classes.
 		 	
Sometimes misunderstood in the West as the archetypal or stereotypical aesthetics of Japanese culture,  refers to a distinct aesthetic ideal of subdued displays of taste and/or wealth, with an emphasis on belying, on first glance, the efforts – monetary or otherwise – taken to appear stylish. , having come into prominence around the same as many other now-traditional artforms, remains a cornerstone of aesthetic appeal and thought in traditional Japanese culture. Both geisha and kimono, amongst other cultural aspects, are thought to have been influenced by and developed through , and remain largely influenced by it to this day.

History
During the Edo period, a number of edicts were passed by the ruling samurai classes restricting expressions of material wealth by those officially lower in the social hierarchy as a way of preserving the status of the upper classes; this included edicts of dress preventing the lower classes from visibly appearing to be above their social class.

Though dress edicts had little impact on much of the working classes, who had little access to wealth allowing them to purchase new and expensive silk kimono, the merchant classes – socially impoverished but monetarily powerful – were directly hit by these laws, as changes had, over time, led them to control much of Japan's economy.

By too flagrant a display of his affluence, a townsman ran the risk of having his wealth confiscated. A merchant's home therefore was likely to have had an unassuming exterior, yet to have been full of treasures. He might have worn a sober, plain wool kimono – with an exquisite silk lining. Opulence was channeled into subtle details.

Despite this, individual warriors considered to be upper class came to be depicted commonly as embodying , typically through ideals of a clear, stylish manner and blunt, unwavering directness, regardless of circumstance, heartbreak or individual feeling; stories of rogue warriors choosing duty over often pained and tormented personal feelings became popular stories in kabuki, a form of theatre popular within the merchant classes.

This concept came to embody geisha so entirely that rival political factions often patronised entirely different geisha quarters, with the geisha of each staying loyal to their customers. Geisha, alongside rogue warriors, also became the common subject of many kabuki plays revolving around duty versus one's own feelings.

The term  became widespread in modern intellectual circles through the book The Structure of Iki (1930) by Kuki Shūzō.

Interpretation

 is considered to be an expression of carefully calculated simplicity, the ideal being that a mundane appearance would be considered  in the context of the viewer's understanding of the effort undertaken to achieve the result.  also encompasses ideals of spontaneity and originality, with it being considered stylish to appear spontaneous and carefree, even if the efforts undertaken to appear as such happen to be considerably involved; a lack of self-consciousness, and being considered naturally, casually chic are core concepts of being considered . Though the nature of  may be considered the antithesis of other Japanese aesthetics such as kawaii, at times,  may exhibit traits of other aesthetics in a direct and unabashed manner.

 is not used to describe natural phenomena, but may be expressed in an appreciation of natural beauty, or of nature of human beings. The writings of author Murakami Haruki (born 1949) are considered to be  through their clear and unflinching writing style.

The indefinite ideal of  can be said to reference a highly cultivated but not necessarily solemn sensibility. The  sensibility resists being construed within the context of overly specific rules about what could be considered as vulgar or uncouth.

(and some -style) can be transferred from person to person in form of "tips." As  is more focused in knowledge, it may be considered superficial from  point of view, since  cannot be easily attained by learning.

The contexts of their usages are also different.

See also

References

Further reading
 Gallagher, John. (2003). Geisha: A Unique World of Tradition, Elegance, and Art. New York: Sterling Publishing. 
 Heidegger, Martin. (1982). "A Dialogue on Language: between a Japanese and an Inquirer." On The Way to Language. San Francisco: Harper & Row.  (paper)
 Nara, Hiroshi. (2004). The Structure of Detachment: the Aesthetic Vision of Kuki Shūzō with a translation of "Iki no kōzō." Honolulu: University of Hawaii Press. ; ;  OCLC 644791079
 Nussbaum, Louis-Frédéric and Käthe Roth. (2005).  Japan encyclopedia. Cambridge: Harvard University Press. ;  OCLC 58053128
 Pincus, Leslie. (1996). Authenticating Culture in Imperial Japan: Kuki Shūzō and the Rise of National Aesthetics. Berkeley: University of California Press.  (paper)
 Seigle, Cecila Segawa. (1993). Yoshiwara: The Glittering World of the Japanese Courtesan. Honolulu: University of Hawai'i Press.  (paper)
 Botz-Bornstein, Thorsten. (1997) 'Iki, Style, Trace: Shuzo Kuki and the Spirit of Hermeneutics' in Philosophy East and West Vol. 47, Nr. 4, October 1997, p. 554-580.

External links
  "An Aesthetics of Everyday Life: Modernism and a Japanese popular aesthetic ideal, Iki"—A modern approach towards 
  九鬼周造『「いき」の構造』—A classic theory of 

Concepts in aesthetics
Japanese aesthetics
Words and phrases with no direct English translation
Japanese words and phrases